Henry Francis Lyte (1 June 1793 – 20 November 1847) was a British Anglican divine, hymnodist, and poet.

Biography

Youth and education
Henry Francis Lyte was the second son of Thomas and Anna Maria (née Oliver) Lyte, whose family came originally from Lytes Cary Manor.  He was born at Ednam, near Kelso, Scotland.  Lyte's father was described as a "ne-er do-well ... more interested in fishing and shooting than in facing up to his family responsibilities".  He deserted the family shortly after making arrangements for his two oldest sons to attend Portora Royal School in Enniskillen, County Fermanagh, in Ulster; and Anna moved to London, where both she and her youngest son died.

The headmaster at Portora, Robert Burrowes, recognised Lyte's ability, paid the boy's fees and "welcomed him into his own family during the holidays". Lyte was effectively an adopted son.

Religious conversion
After studying at Trinity College, Dublin, and with very limited training for ordained ministry, Lyte took Anglican holy orders in 1815 and for some time he held a curacy in Taghmon near Wexford. Lyte's "sense of vocation was vague at this early stage. Perhaps he felt an indefinable desire to do something good in life". However, in about 1816, Lyte experienced an evangelical conversion. In attendance on a dying priest, the latter convinced Lyte that both had earlier been mistaken in not having taken the epistles of St Paul "in their plain and literal sense". Lyte began to study the Bible "and preach in another manner," following the example of four or five local clergy whom he had previously laughed at and considered "enthusiastic rhapsodists".

Early career and marriage

In 1817 Lyte became a curate in Marazion, Cornwall, and there met and married Anne Maxwell, daughter of a well-known Scottish-Irish family. She was 31, seven years older than her husband and a "keen Methodist." Furthermore, she "could not match her husband's good looks and personal charm."  Nevertheless, the marriage was happy and successful. Anne eventually made Lyte's situation more comfortable by contributing her family fortune, and she was an excellent manager of the house and finances.  They had two daughters and three sons, one of whom was the chemist and photographer Farnham Maxwell-Lyte. A grandson was the well known historian Sir Henry Churchill Maxwell-Lyte.

From 1820 to 1822 the Lytes lived in Sway, Hampshire. Itself only  from the sea, the house in Sway was the only one the couple shared during their marriage that was neither on a river or by the sea. At Sway Lyte lost a month-old daughter and wrote his first book, later published as Tales In Verse Illustrative of the Several Petitions of the Lord's Prayer (1826).  In 1822 the Lytes moved to Dittisham, Devon, on the River Dart and then, after Lyte had regained some measure of health, to the small parish of Charleton.

Brixham

About April 1824, Lyte left Charleton for Lower Brixham, a Devon fishing village.  Almost immediately, Lyte joined the schools committee, and two months later he became its chairman. Also in 1824, Lyte established the first Sunday school in the Torbay area and created a Sailors' Sunday School. Although religious instruction was given there, the primary object of both was educating children and seamen for whom other schooling was virtually impossible. Each year Lyte organised an Annual Treat for the 800–1000 Sunday school children, which included a short religious service followed by tea and sports in the field.

Shortly after Lyte's arrival in Brixham, the minister attracted such large crowds that the church had to be enlarged—the resulting structure later described by his grandson as "a hideous barn-like building."  Lyte added to his clerical income by taking resident pupils into his home, including the blind brother of Lord Robert Gascoyne-Cecil, later British prime minister.  About 1830, Lyte made excavations at nearby Ash Hole Cavern, where he discovered pottery and human remains.

Character and personality

Lyte was a tall and "unusually handsome" man, "slightly eccentric but of great personal charm, a man noted for his wit and human understanding, a born poet and an able scholar." He was an expert flute player and according to his great-grandson always had his flute with him. Lyte spoke Latin, Greek, and French; enjoyed discussing literature; and was knowledgeable about wild flowers. At Berry Head House, a former military hospital at Berry Head, Lyte built a magnificent library —largely of theology and old English poetry—described in his obituary as "one of the most extensive and valuable in the West of England."

Nevertheless, Lyte was also able to identify with his parish of fishermen, visiting them at their homes and on board their ships in harbour, supplying every vessel with a Bible, and compiling songs and a manual of devotions for use at sea.  In theology Lyte was a conservative evangelical who believed that man's nature was totally corrupt. Lyte frequently rose at 6 AM and prayed for two or more hours before breakfast.

In politics, Lyte was a Conservative who feared revolt among the irreligious poor.  He publicly opposed Catholic Emancipation by speaking against it in several Devon towns, stating that he preferred Catholics to be "emancipated from priests and from the power of the factious and turbulent demagogues of Ireland."  Lyte, a friend of Samuel Wilberforce, also opposed slavery, organising an 1833 petition to Parliament requesting it be abolished in Great Britain.

Decline and death
In poor health throughout his life, Lyte suffered various respiratory illnesses and often visited continental Europe in attempts to check their progress. In 1835 Lyte sought appointment as the vicar of Crediton but was rejected because of his increasingly debilitating asthma and bronchitis.  In 1839, when only 46, Lyte wrote a poem entitled "Declining Days."  Lyte also grew discouraged when numbers of his congregation (including in 1846, nearly his entire choir) left him for Dissenter congregations, especially the Plymouth Brethren, after Lyte expressed High Church sympathies and leaned towards the Oxford Movement.

By the 1840s, Lyte was spending much of his time in the warmer climates of France and Italy, making written suggestions about the conduct of his family's financial affairs after his death. When his daughter was married to his senior curate, Lyte did not perform the ceremony.  Lyte complained of weakness and incessant coughing spasms, and he mentions medical treatments of blistering, bleeding, calomel, tartar emetic, and "large doses" of Prussic acid. Yet his friends found him buoyant, cheerful, and keenly interested in affairs of the Europe around him.  Lyte spent the summer of 1847 at Berry Head then, after one final sermon to his congregation on the subject of the Holy Communion, he left again for Italy.  He died on 20 November 1847 at the age of 54, in the city of Nice, at that time in the Kingdom of Sardinia, where he was buried. His last words were "Peace! Joy!"

Works
Lyte's first composition was Tales in Verse illustrative of Several of the Petitions in the Lord's Prayer (1826), written at Lymington and commended by John Wilson in the Noctes Ambrosianae. Lyte next published Poems, chiefly Religious (1833), and in 1834, a small collection of psalms and hymns entitled The Spirit of the Psalms. After his death, a volume of Remains (1850) with a memoir was issued, and the poems contained in this, with those in Poems, chiefly Religious, were afterward published in one volume (1868). Three of Lyte's best-known hymns are paraphrases of psalms, published in The Spirit of the Psalms: "Praise, my soul, the King of heaven" (Psalm 103), "God of Mercy, God of Grace" (Psalm 67), and "Pleasant are thy courts above" (Psalm 84). 

Lyte's best known hymns are:
 Abide with me! fast falls the eventide
 Jesus, I my cross have taken
 Praise, my soul, the King of Heaven
 Pleasant are Thy courts above.

Abide with me
Of these hymns, "Abide with Me" is the best known. According to the traditional story given in the Remains, Lyte wrote it a few hours after conducting the final service at his church, which was probably 5 September 1847. More likely the hymn was actually written in July or August of that year. 

Lyte himself created for the hymn what his biographer has disparaged as "a dull tune." When Hymns Ancient and Modern was published in 1861, the editor, William H. Monk—whose three-year-old daughter had just died—composed his own tune, "Eventide," for Lyte's poem.  

The hymn became a favourite of George V and George VI and was sung at the former's funeral. The hymn also inspired Field Marshal Herbert Kitchener and General Charles "Chinese" Gordon, and it was said to have been on the lips of Edith Cavell as she faced a German firing squad in 1915.  

"Abide with Me" has been sung prior to kick-off at the FA Cup final since 1927 when the association secretary substituted the hymn for the playing of "Alexander's Ragtime Band." In Rugby league, the hymn has been sung before the Challenge Cup final since 1929, the first year the match was staged at Wembley Stadium. The hymn was also played by the combined bands of the Indian Armed Forces during the annual Beating Retreat ceremony held on 29 January at Vijay Chowk, New Delhi, which officially marks the end of Republic Day celebrations but was dropped by Narendra Modi government before the celebrations of Republic day events in year 2022 citing its foreign origin not in sync with India's ancient republican ideas. The hymn is the Portora Royal School victory song and is sung at its remembrance service.

Significance
Leon Litvack has written in the Oxford Dictionary of National Biography that although Lyte's "poetic energies were directed at scripturally and evangelically minded audiences, his lyric gift was universally appreciated. The example of ‘Abide with me’ is instructive: intensely personal and contemplative, yet nationally popular—even being sung (always, after its publication in 1861, to W. H. Monk's tune, ‘Eventide’) on secular occasions such as at football matches, and especially, since 1927, at the English cup final."  The 20th-century hymnologist Erik Routley referred to the "much-loved H. R. Lyte" who "though scriptural and evangelical in his emphases, always writes good literature and is rarely deserted by an exquisite lyric gift. Perhaps the centrally 'romantic' hymn of all hymns is the intensely personal yet, as it has proved, wholly universal hymn, 'Abide with me.'"

Notes

References

Bibliography

External links

 
 
 Text, MIDI, and piano score from HymnSite.com
 
 Catalogue of the library of H.F. Lyte
 Heaven Will Bring Me Sweeter Rest: Selected works of Henry Francis Lyte

1793 births
1847 deaths
19th-century deaths from tuberculosis
Scottish poets
Church of England hymnwriters
People educated at Portora Royal School
19th-century Scottish Episcopalian priests
Scottish Episcopalian hymnwriters
Scottish evangelicals
Tuberculosis deaths in France
People from Kelso, Scottish Borders
19th-century English Anglican priests
Evangelical Anglican clergy